Hardwick with Tusmore is a civil parish in Oxfordshire, England. It was formed in 1932 by merger of the parishes of Hardwick and Tusmore.

Sources

References

Civil parishes in Oxfordshire